is the 36th single by the Japanese pop group Every Little Thing, released on August 27, 2008. It was used as the theme song for the drama Shibatora.

Track listing
 
(Words - Kaori Mochida / Music - Eriko Yoshiki)
 
(Words & Music - Kaori Mochida)

External links
 Avex Network information

2008 singles
Every Little Thing (band) songs
Songs written by Kaori Mochida
Japanese television drama theme songs
Albums produced by Seiji Kameda
2008 songs
Avex Trax singles